Jessica Molaskey (born January 9, 1962) is an American professional actor and singer of torch songs and show tunes. She has appeared in a dozen Broadway shows, including Sunday in the Park with George, Tommy, Crazy for You, Chess, Oklahoma!, Cats, City of Angels, and the first national tour of Joseph and the Amazing Technicolor Dreamcoat.

She has premiered theater pieces Off-Broadway, including the Jason Robert Brown 1995 musical Songs for a New World, A Man of No Importance, and Parade at Lincoln Center, Dream True at the Vineyard Theatre, Stephen Sondheim's Wise Guys (New York Theatre Workshop),  The Most Happy Fella as part of the Encores! series at City Center and many world premieres in regional theaters across the US. Molaskey performed the role of Sister Bertha in NBC's The Sound of Music Live! starring Carrie Underwood.
 
She has performed in concert all over the world from Carnegie Hall to Disney Hall and in jazz festivals from Montreal to Monterey. Her songwriting skills can be heard on dozens of recordings, including Cradle and All which she wrote with Ricky Ian Gordon for Audra McDonald's Build a Bridge album and The Greedy Tadpole, part of a commission for McDonald of the Seven Deadly Sins for Carnegie Hall. Her concert Portraits of Joni, as part Lincoln Center's American Songbook series, featured her daughter Madeleine Pizzarelli on guitar and vocals.

Molaskey is married to jazz guitarist John Pizzarelli.

Discography

References

External links

 

Torch singers
American women jazz singers
American jazz singers
Living people
1962 births
20th-century American singers
20th-century American women singers
21st-century American singers
21st-century American women singers
People from Wolcott, Connecticut
Singers from Connecticut
Jazz musicians from Connecticut
Arbors Records artists